Clapham was a district of the City of Gloucester that was developed from 1822 by George Worrall Counsel who built several hundred houses for artisans. It included Worrall Street and Counsel Street, neither of which now exist. The area was redeveloped in the twentieth century and is now part of Kingsholm.

See also
 Worcester Street

References

Further reading
 Eley, Harold. (1996) Clapham Tales: A Boyhood Account of Life in Clapham, Gloucester, During the 1930s and 1940s. Pickton Press.

External links 

Areas of Gloucester
History of Gloucester